The College of Fisheries Science and Research Centre  is a government college in Etawah, Uttar Pradesh, India started in 4th dean committee 2015. And 5th dean committee 1st Batch start 2016 It is also known as the Faculty of Fisheries Science, Chandra Shekhar Azad University of Agriculture and Technology.

See also
Central Institute of Fisheries Education
Chandra Shekhar Azad University of Agriculture and Technology
Baba Saheb Dr. Bhim Rao Ambedkar College of Agricultural Engineering and Technology
College of Dairy Technology, Etawah
College of Agriculture, Lakhimpur Kheri
Tamil Nadu Fisheries University
Fisheries College and Research Institute
College of Fisheries, Mangalore

References

External links
 Official website

Universities and colleges in Etawah district
Agricultural universities and colleges in Uttar Pradesh
Education in Etawah
Chandra Shekhar Azad University of Agriculture and Technology